One third of Basildon Borough Council in Essex, England is elected each year, followed by one year without election. Since the last boundary changes in 2002, 42 councillors have been elected from 16 wards.

Political control
Since the first election to the council in 1973 political control of the council has been held by the following parties:

Leadership
The leaders of the council since 2009 have been:

The mayors since the district was awarded borough status in 2010 have been:

Council elections
1973 Basildon District Council election
1976 Basildon District Council election
1979 Basildon District Council election (New ward boundaries)
1980 Basildon District Council election
1982 Basildon District Council election
1983 Basildon District Council election
1984 Basildon District Council election (District boundary changes took place but the number of seats remained the same)
1986 Basildon District Council election
1987 Basildon District Council election
1988 Basildon District Council election
1990 Basildon District Council election
1991 Basildon District Council election
1992 Basildon District Council election
1994 Basildon District Council election
1995 Basildon District Council election
1996 Basildon District Council election
1998 Basildon District Council election
1999 Basildon District Council election
2000 Basildon District Council election
2002 Basildon District Council election (New ward boundaries)
2003 Basildon District Council election
2004 Basildon District Council election
2006 Basildon District Council election
2007 Basildon District Council election
2008 Basildon District Council election
2010 Basildon District Council election
2011 Basildon Borough Council election
2012 Basildon Borough Council election
2014 Basildon Borough Council election
2015 Basildon Borough Council election
2016 Basildon Borough Council election
2018 Basildon Borough Council election
2019 Basildon Borough Council election
2021 Basildon Borough Council election
2022 Basildon Borough Council election

Borough result maps

By-election results

1998–2002

2002-2006

2010-2014

2018-2022

2022-2026

References

By-election results

External links
Basildon Borough Council

 
Council elections in Essex
Politics of the Borough of Basildon
District council elections in England